Elektromis was a Poznań holding dealing in wholesale trade, sold in 1995 to Jerónimo Martins.

The company was founded in 1987 by Mariusz Świtalski. The first warehouses began operations in 1990. In a short time, Elektromis became the largest wholesale network in Poland.

Between 1994-2002, a lawsuit was filed in the area of customs fraud and illegal trade in Elektromis, resulting in a conviction of four out of thirteen defendants.

References 

Polish brands
Supermarkets of Poland